One Park Drive is a residential skyscraper situated in the south west corner of Wood Wharf, within the Canary Wharf development on the Isle of Dogs, London. 

The building is the first residential development designed by Swiss based architecture firm Herzog & de Meuron in the United Kingdom. It is cylindrical in shape, with 57-storeys comprising 471 private residential apartments and penthouses. The sub penthouses on floor 55 were launched in September 2022 and the main penthouses on floors 56-57 with duplex floors were launched in October 2022.

Gallery

Planning application
Tower Hamlets reference: PA/15/00018

References

External links
 

Buildings and structures in the London Borough of Tower Hamlets
Skyscrapers in the London Borough of Tower Hamlets
Residential skyscrapers in London